The 1st district of the Iowa Senate, located in Northwestern Iowa, is currently composed of part of Woodbury County Its current member of the Iowa Senate is Republican Rocky De Witt.

Past senators
The district has previously been represented by:

E. S. McCulloch, William Thurston, 1856–1857
John Allen, John Rankin, 1858–1859
Valentine Buechel, John Rankin, 1860–1861
Frederick Hesser, George W. McCrary, 1862–1865
Nathaniel Hedges, Joseph Hollman, 1866–1869
E. S. McCulloch, 1870–1873
Henry Rothert, 1874–1877
James Shelley, 1878–1881
Henry Rothert, 1882–1885
J. M. Casey, 1886–1887
William Kent, 1888–1893
John Downey, 1894–1897
David Young, 1898–1906
E. P. McManus, 1907–1914
Joseph R. Frailey, 1915–1922
Isaac Snook, 1923–1926
Joseph R. Frailey, 1927–1934
Timothy Francis Driscoll, 1935–1938
Stanley L. Hart, 1939–1954
Edward J. McManus, 1955–1958
Charles F. Eppers, 1959–1962
Seeley G. Lodwick, 1963–1969
Wilson L. Davis, 1970
Lucas DeKoster, 1971–1982
Milo Colton, 1983–1986
Al Sturgeon, 1987–1994
Steven D. Hansen, 1995–2002
Steven Warnstadt, 2003–2010
Rick Bertrand, 2011–2012
David Johnson, 2013–2019
Zach Whiting, 2019–2021
Dave Rowley, 2021–2023
Rocky De Witt, 2023–present

Election Results

2018

See also
Iowa General Assembly
Iowa Senate

References

01